Tad is a male given name or shortened version of Tadhg, Thaddeus, Thomas or other names. It may refer to:

People
 Tad Boyle (born 1963), University of Colorado men's basketball head coach and former player
 Tad Crawford (born 1984), Canadian Football League player
 Tad Devine (born 1955), American political consultant
 Tad Dorgan (1877–1929), American cartoonist
 Edward T. Foote II (born 1937), fourth president of the University of Miami
 Tad Gormley (1884–1965), Louisiana State University men's basketball head coach and trainer
 Tad Hilgenbrink (born 1981), American actor
 Tad Jones (politician) (born 1972), American politician
 Tad Kornegay (born 1982), collegiate football and Canadian Football League player
 Tad Lincoln (1853–1871), youngest son of Abraham and Mary Lincoln
 Tad J. Oelstrom (born 1943), retired US Air Force lieutenant general
 Tad Mosel (1922–2008), American Pulitzer Prize-winning playwright and dramatist
 Tad Richards (born 1940), American writer and visual artist
 Tad Robinson, (born 1956), American soul blues singer
 Tad Schmaltz (born 1960), professor of philosophy at the University of Michigan
 Tad Stones (born c. 1952), American animator, screenwriter, producer and director best known for his work for The Walt Disney Company
 Tad Wieman (1896–1971), American collegiate football player, coach and athletic director

Fictional characters
 Thaddeus "Tad" Martin, on the American soap opera All My Children
 Wayne Terrence "Tad" Reeves, on the Australian soap opera Neighbours
 General Thaddeus Ross, from Marvel Comics, enemy of the Hulk
 Tad Hamilton, in the movie Win a Date with Tad Hamilton!
 Tad Spencer, a wealthy resident of Bullworth and member of the  Prep clique from Bully (video game)
 Tad, a longnose butterflyfish in the Finding Nemo franchise
 Tad Ghostal, the real name of Space Ghost in Space Ghost: Coast to Coast
 Dr. Thaddeus "Rusty" Venture from the American animated television series The Venture Bros.
 Tad Strange, most average citizen in the town of Gravity Falls, Oregon
 Tad Cooper, Dragon from the tv show Galavant

See also
 Thad

References

Masculine given names
Hypocorisms